Alice Ripley (born December 14, 1963) is an American actress, singer, songwriter and mixed media artist. She is known, in particular, for her various roles on Broadway in musicals, including the Pulitzer Prize-winning Next to Normal (2009 Tony Award, Best Actress in a Musical) and Side Show.  She most recently played three roles in the short-lived Broadway musical, American Psycho. Alice Ripley has released albums with her band, RIPLEY, including the single, "Beautiful Eyes", released in February 2012. She also performs as a solo artist, while in February 2011 she released Alice Ripley Daily Practice, Volume 1, a stripped-down collection of acoustic rock covers.

Early life
Ripley was born in California and graduated from West Carrollton High School outside of Dayton, Ohio.

Career

Early work
Ripley attended DePauw University, where she majored in Vocal Performance, before transferring to Kent State University where she received a BFA in Musical Theatre in 1985. While at University, Ripley performed in a number of stage productions, while her first paid acting job was at the Red Barn Summer Theatre in Frankfort, Indiana. Following college, she was active in community theatre in San Diego, California, and subsequently received her Actor's Equity card at the La Jolla Playhouse through a production of Silent Edward, a musical written by Des McAnuff, who was Artistic Director of the La Jolla Playhouse at the time and who would later direct Ripley in her Broadway debut in The Who's Tommy.

Broadway
In her 1993 debut, Ripley played a Local Lass and the Specialist's Assistant in the original cast of The Who's Tommy; she also understudied the role of Mrs. Walker. Broadway roles that followed were Betty Schaefer in Sunset Boulevard (1994), Bathsheba in King David (1997), Violet Hilton in Side Show (1997), Fantine in Les Misérables (1998), Molly Ivors in James Joyce's The Dead (2000), Janet Weiss in The Rocky Horror Show (2000), one of The Sweethearts in Dreamgirls, the concert (2001), and Diana Goodman in Next to Normal (2009). With the exception of Les Misérables and The Rocky Horror Show, Ripley was part of the original casts.

Ripley's performance as conjoined twin Violet Hilton in Side Show earned her and her co-star Emily Skinner critical acclaim, a cult following, and a shared 1998 Tony Award nomination, making them the first to be co-nominated in a musical. She was nominated for a Drama Desk Award for Outstanding Actress in a Musical.

From March 27, 2009 to July 18, 2010 at the Booth Theatre, Ripley starred in the Pulitzer Prize-winning Next to Normal, a performance which earned her the 2009 Tony Award for Best Actress in a Musical.

In 2016, Ripley appeared in the Broadway musical, American Psycho, playing the mother of the main character, Patrick Bateman, as well as the roles of Mrs. Wolfe and Svetlana.

Off-Broadway
Ripley's 2008 performance in Next to Normal (Second Stage Theatre) earned her Drama Desk and Outer Critics Circle award nominations. Additional Off-Broadway roles include Nelly Bly in Cather County (1993, Playwrights Horizons), Daisy Mae in Li'l Abner (1998, New York City Center), various characters in The Vagina Monologues (2002, Westside Theatre), Olivia in Five Flights (2004, Rattlestick Theater), Marsha in Wild Animals You Should Know (2011, MCC/Lucille Lortel Theater), Mary Todd Lincoln, Lewis Payne, and other roles in A Civil War Christmas (2012, NYTW), and Sook Faulk in A Christmas Memory.

Regional theatre
Ripley's regional credits include Clybourne Park at the Long Wharf Theatre, New Haven, as Bev/Kathy in May 2013; Next to Normal at Arena Stage (Helen Hayes Award, Best Actress in a Musical, non-resident production), Little Shop of Horrors, Tell Me On A Sunday (Helen Hayes nomination), Company (Helen Hayes nomination), Gentlemen Prefer Blondes, Show Boat, Shakespeare in Hollywood (Helen Hayes nomination), The Baker's Wife, Sweeney Todd, Carousel, and Carrie.

National tours
On tour, Ripley played Fantine in Les Misérables (1993–94). She reprised her role as Diana in Next to Normal, the U.S. Tour (November 23, 2010 – July 30, 2011).

Film
Ripley's films include The Adulterer (2000), Temptation (2004), Isn't It Delicious (2013), Sing Along (2013), The Way I Remember It (2015), Bear With Us (2016), SUGAR! (2016), and Muckland (2015).

Television
Ripley appeared in an episode of Girlboss, a new Netflix half-hour comedy which premiered in April 2017.  She previously guest-starred on Blue Bloods and Royal Pains, and played herself in the series finale of the TV comedy, 30 Rock.

Controversies
In 2010, Ripley used a homophobic slur in a Facebook post. Many within the theater community found it insensitive, while some came to her defense. Ripley soon apologized for her words.

Grooming allegations
In 2021, Ripley was accused by 4 women of grooming them when they were in their early teens. The claims involved Ripley having sexual conversations with the teens and forming a cult. Ripley denied the claims of grooming. Despite stating the accusations were ‘vile,’ Ripley offered an apology to her accusers.

Discography

Ripleytheband
 "Beautiful Eyes" single (2012, self-produced)
 Alice Ripley Daily Practice, Volume 1 (2011, Sh-K-Boom Records)
 Outtasite (2006, Shellac)
 Ripley EP (2003, Shellac)
 Everything's Fine (2001, Ghostlight)

Broadway Cast Recordings
 Next to Normal (2009, Sh-K-Boom) (Original)
 Dreamgirls (2002, Nonesuch) (Concert Production)
 The Rocky Horror Show (2000, RCA Victor Broadway) (Revival)
 Side Show (1997, Sony Classical) (Original) 
 King David (1997, Walt Disney) (Original)
 The Who's Tommy (1992, RCA Victor Broadway) (Original)

Original Cast Recording
 Bubble Boy (2017, Ghostlight)
 Little Fish (2007, Ghostlight)

References

External links

 
 
 

1960s births
20th-century American actresses
21st-century American actresses
American musical theatre actresses
American women singers
DePauw University alumni
Kent State University alumni
Living people
People from Montgomery County, Ohio
Tony Award winners